The term Government of India Act refers to the series of Acts passed by the Parliament of the United Kingdom to regulate the government of Colonial India, in particular:

Government of India Act 1833 or Saint Helena Act, created the post of Governor-General General of India
Government of India Act 1858, established India as a nation consisting of British India and princely states.
Government of India Act 1909 or Indian Councils Act 1909, brought about a limited increase in the involvement of Indians in the governance of colonial India
Government of India Act, 1912, modified the Indian Councils Act 1909 and undid the Division of Bengal (1905)
Government of India Act, 1915, a aggregation into a single Act of most of the existing Acts of Parliament concerning Indian government
Government of India Act 1919, passed to expand participation of Indians in the government of India
Government of India Act 1921 or Round Table Conferences, a series of conferences to discuss constitutional reforms in India
Government of India Act 1935, never fully implemented, served as part of the constitutional basis of India and Pakistan.

See also
Indian Councils Act 1861
Indian Councils Act 1892